George Frankham Shell known as George Gerard Shelley (Sidcup, Kent 1891 – 24 August 1980) was a British linguist, author and translator who travelled in Imperial Russia before and during the Russian Revolution. He became a priest and lived in a community of the Oblates of St. Joseph. He was ordained in March 1950 as a bishop in the Old Roman Catholic Church in Great Britain (ORCCGB). In 1952 he became the third archbishop.

Life 

Brought up as a Roman Catholic, Shelley attended an Italian college near Lake Garda in 1907. Near Venice he was invited by a Russian aristocrat, Countess Bobrinsky, to visit her. He was a graduate of the University of Heidelberg as well as the Major Seminary and Collège Saint-Sulpice in Paris. In 1913, influenced by Stephen Graham, he travelled by train from Warsaw to Kursk, Kharkov, Belgorod and Shebekino where he stayed for a year with his host and learned Russian at  Kharkov University. (He already spoke French, German, and Italian from an early age.) After World War I broke out he worked as an interpreter for various groups of prisoners of war. In April 1915 he stayed on the family estate in Bogoroditsk; he visited Moscow and met with Grigori Rasputin in the atelier of a sculptor, probably Naoum Aronson. On 26 March, Rasputin is said, while inebriated, to have opened his trousers and waved his "reproductive organ" in front of a group of female gypsy singers in the Yar restaurant. A few days later a waiter assessed the story to Shelley as bunkum.

In St. Peterburg, Shelley met with Count Vladimir Frederiks, and again with Rasputin and the Empress, accompanied by her daughter Grand Duchess Tatiana, drinking tea in his apartment. Rasputin visited him also, when Shelley was camping at Lake Ladoga in 1916.

In December of the same year, Shelley went back to the UK for Christmas and defended Rasputin. In his book "The speckled domes" he describes Rasputin as an ascetic, an old testament prophet, or as a medieval figure from the pages of Chaucer. "Although a peasant he had clear ideas on a host of matters." Most stories known about Rasputin, being filthy, smelly, or drunk, were invented [or exaggerated] by the Russian aristocracy, because they hated peasants, already for centuries. According to Shelley, Russia was a caste society and "perhaps no man in history has been so furiously calumniated."

In January, Shelley went back to the Russian Republic. Shelley gives an account of the mood after the February Revolution and gives his view on the Russian Provisional Government, Lenin and the October Revolution.  Back in Moscow he wrote about free love and the changing attitude to marriage in the early years of communist Russia; the murdering of Tsar Nicholas II (at that time it was not known the whole family was killed); the socialists, the anarchists, the Jews in the Bolshevik party (see also Jewish Bolshevism); the famine, the ruble, the escape of Alexander Krivoshein, his meetings with the wife of Mikhail Pokrovsky and Sinn Féin. Shelley was accused of being a counter-revolutionary and unable to leave the country as a hostage. He escaped, dressed as a woman, stuck under the seats in a train from Moscow to Finland surrounded by a group of French women, who together bribed the chief Red Guard. He arrived in Sweden where he had his first decent meal in months.

Back in London, he describes a pro-Russia meeting at Speakers Corner in Hyde Park. Shelley defended free labour unions. He worked as an interpreter at the Paris Peace Conference (1919). In 1921 he was contracted by the International Federation of Trade Unions in Switzerland.

After WWII 
In 1943 founded in New York a Society of Our Lady of Port Royal, which propagated the traditions of Jansenism.
During World War II, Shelley translated poems by Aleksandr Pushkin, Mikhail Lermontov, Boris Pasternak and Alexander Blok.

After 1952 he spent some time in America, where the Old Catholic influence was much stronger than in the UK. He corresponded with the Catholic Australian authors Martin Boyd and Desmond O'Grady; when he became the Archbishop of Caer-Glow, the Primate of the Old Catholic Church in England and America. In 1959 Shelley's ORCC opposed the Dogma of Papal Infallibility. In 1960 he consecrated Paget King, but in the year after he regretted this. Shelley became resident in Rome from 1962 till 1965? During and after the time of Vatican II, Archbishop Shelley began to see a continued purpose in resisting the runaway changes of Catholic liberalism. Under the guidance of Shelley, the Order of Saint John of Jerusalem produced a brochure entitled "An Account of the Old Roman Catholic Church" in 1964. In 1964, five independent sects derived their apostolic succession through Arnold Mathew. Except for the Liberal Catholic Church, the "sects hardly counted numerically at all." Shelley was excommunicated on 7 April 1965.

It seems he functioned as Chairman of the OSJ Ecclesiastical Committee at least as late as April 1969. After 1977 Archbishop Shelley was largely inactive due to advanced age. It is not known if he ever married, although the Old Catholic church allows it to priests.

He was not related to the poet Percy Bysshe Shelley.

Works 

 The trail of the Amazons. London [1924]
 The Speckled Domes. Episodes of an Englishman's life in Russia. [With plates, including a portrait.]. London Duckworth [1925]
 The Blue Steppes: Adventures among Russians. London J. Hamilton [1925].
 The beautiful Scythian. London: John Hamilton [1926]
 Gala Knights [1926]
 The white villa at Dinard. London Gay and Hancock [1927].
 The Enchanted Dawn. Poems by Gerard Shelley [1928]

Translations 

 The memoirs of Mme Elizabeth Louise Vigée-Le Brun, 1755–1789. London Hamilton [1927]; New York George H. Doran Company Publishers [1927].
 "History of the Expedition to Russia, Undertaken by the Emperor Napoleon in the Year 1812". The memoirs and anecdotes of the Count de Ségur. Sundial ed. London. [1928]
 The Memoirs of the Duchess of Abrantès, 1830. With an introduction by Louis Loviot. [With plates, including portraits.]. London Jamie Hamilton [1929]
 The Demon by Mikhail Lermontov. With an introduction by Prince Mirsky. London Richards Press [1930]
 Hell in the Foreign legion by Ernst Friedrich Löhndorff. London G. Allen & Unwin Ltd. [1931]; New York Greenberg [1932].
 The Emerald Way by Eugène Demolder. London Jamie Hamilton [1931]
 The Third Oecumenical Council and the Primacy of the Bishop of Rome. A reply to the encyclical "Lux Veritatis" of Pius XI. By Archbishop of Athens and All Greece Chrysostomos Papadopoulos. London Faith Press [1933]
 Songs from the Russian Cabaret. Translated and arranged by G. Shelley. London : Cary & Co [1936]
 Modern poems from Russia. London Allen & Unwin [1941/2]; Westport, Conn Greenwood Press [1977]. 
 Russia at War by Ilya Erenburg; authorized translation from the Russian by Gerard Shelley; with an introduction by J.B. Priestley. London Hamish Hamilton [1943]
 Four Soviet war plays.--The front, by Oleksandr Korniychuk.--Invasion, by Leonid Leonov.--The Russians, by Konstantin Simonov. Guerillas of the Ukrainian steppes, by Oleksandr Korniychuk
 The fall of Paris by Ilya Ehrenburg. London Hutchinson [1942/5]; New York [1943]; London May Fair Books [1962].
 Before the storm: recollections by I.M. Maisky. London, New York, Melbourne. Hutchinson & co. ltd., [1944]
  The Hunter of the Pamirs. A novel of adventure in Soviet Central Asia by Georgi Tushkan. London Hutchinson & Co. [1944]
 Old England by Evgeny Lann [1945]
 Folk tales of the peoples of the Soviet Union by Gerard Shelley [1945]
 Three Colours of Time. A novel of the life of Stendhal by Anatoli Vinogradov. London Hutchinson & Co. 1946

References

External links 
 COPAC with most of the titles
 LON Archives - 

Translators from Russian
Translators from French
20th-century British translators
1892 births
1980 deaths
Old Catholic bishops
English Old Catholics
Former Roman Catholics